Trifurcula manygoza is a moth of the family Nepticulidae. It is only known to be from Croatia and north-western Greece. But is probably also present in other Balkan countries.

The wingspan is 4.7–6 mm for males and 5.5 mm for females. Larvae have been found in July and adults were collected in June and August.

The larvae feed on Lotus corniculatus. They mine the leaves of their host plant. The mine consists of a narrow, rather straight gallery with frass in a thin central line, often close to leaf margin, suddenly enlarging into a large blotch, often consuming the entire leaflet. Pupation takes place outside of the mine. The mines are indistinguishable from those of Trifurcula cryptella on the same host, so that vacated mines on Lotus in the Balkan area, where both species occur, cannot be identified.

External links
Review Of The Subgenus Trifurcula (Levarchama), With Two New Species (Lepidoptera: Nepticulidae)

Nepticulidae
Moths of Europe
Moths described in 2007